The Open Ecology Journal is an open-access peer-reviewed scientific journal covering ecology. It publishes original research articles and reviews.

Abstracting and indexing 
The journal is indexed in: 
 Chemical Abstracts
 EMBASE
 Scopus

References

External links 
 

Open access journals
Publications established in 2008
Bentham Open academic journals
English-language journals
Ecology journals